Rhea (minor planet designation: 577 Rhea) is a minor planet orbiting the sun. It is named after Rhea, one of the Titans in Greek mythology. The name may have been inspired by the asteroid's provisional designation 1905 RH.

References

External links
 
 

Background asteroids
Rhea
Rhea
19051020